The 62nd Academy Awards ceremony, presented by the Academy of Motion Picture Arts and Sciences (AMPAS), honored the best films of 1989 and took place on March 26, 1990, at the Dorothy Chandler Pavilion in Los Angeles beginning at 6:00 p.m. PST / 9:00 p.m. EST. During the ceremony, AMPAS presented Academy Awards (commonly referred to as Oscars) in 23 categories. The ceremony, televised in the United States by ABC, was produced by Gil Cates and directed by Jeff Margolis. Actor Billy Crystal hosted the show for the first time. Three weeks earlier in a ceremony held at The Beverly Hilton in Beverly Hills, California on March 3, the Academy Awards for Technical Achievement were presented by hosts Richard Dysart and Diane Ladd.

Driving Miss Daisy won four awards, including Best Picture. Other winners included Glory with three awards, Born on the Fourth of July, The Little Mermaid, and My Left Foot: The Story of Christy Brown with two, and The Abyss, Balance, Batman, Cinema Paradiso, Common Threads: Stories from the Quilt, Dead Poets Society, Henry V, Indiana Jones and the Last Crusade, The Johnstown Flood, and Work Experience with one. The telecast garnered more than 40 million viewers in the United States.

Winners and nominees

The nominees for the 62nd Academy Awards were announced on February 14, 1990, at the Samuel Goldwyn Theater in Beverly Hills, California, by Karl Malden, president of the academy, and the actress Geena Davis. Driving Miss Daisy received the most nominations with nine total; Born on the Fourth of July came in second with eight. Winners were announced during the awards ceremony on March 26, 1990. Driving Miss Daisy became the third film to win Best Picture without a Best Director nomination. At age 80, Jessica Tandy became the oldest winner of competitive acting Oscar at the time. Kenneth Branagh was the fifth person nominated for Best Lead Actor and Best Director for the same film.

Awards

Winners are listed first, highlighted in boldface and indicated with a double-dagger.

Academy Honorary Award
Akira Kurosawa

Jean Hersholt Humanitarian Award
Howard W. Koch

Films with multiple nominations and multiple awards

The following 19 films received multiple nominations:

The following five films received multiple awards:

Presenters and performers
The following individuals presented awards or performed musical numbers.

Presenters (in order of appearance)

Performers (in order of appearance)

Ceremony information

After the negative reception received from the preceding year's ceremony, AMPAS created an Awards Presentation Review Committee to evaluate and determine why the telecast earned such a negative reaction from the media and the entertainment industry. The committee later determined that Carr's biggest mistake was allowing the questionable opening number to run for 12 minutes. Producer and former Directors Guild of America president Gilbert Cates, who headed the committee, said that Carr would have not received such harsh criticism if the number had been much shorter. Newly elected AMPAS president Karl Malden also commented on the last year's telecast, "Some of the people in the Academy felt the show got a little out of control."

In September 1989, Cates was chosen as producer of the 1990 telecast. Malden explained the decision to hire him saying, "Cates, a veteran film and TV director known for his tasteful work in both media will attempt to rectify the damage the last Oscar show did to the Academy's reputation." The following January, actor and comedian Billy Crystal was chosen as host of the ceremony. "We are extremely pleased to have Billy host the show," Cates said in a press release justifying his choice. "His unique talents and his ability to handle the unexpected will be important assets this year."

Cates christened the show with the theme "Around the World in 3 1/2 Hours" commenting that it would "a party thrown around the world". He also explained, "The world is changing, and hopefully the awards show is changing, matching the changes in the world." In tandem with the program's theme, several presenters announced the winners from various international locales such as Buenos Aires, London, Moscow, and Sydney, Australia.

Several other people participated in the production of the ceremony. Documentary filmmaker Chuck Workman assembled a montage saluting "100 Years at the Movies" that was shown at the beginning of the telecast. Film composer and musician Bill Conti served as musical director for the ceremony. Dancer and singer Paula Abdul supervised the Best Song nominee performances and a dance number featuring the Best Costume Design nominees. Singer Diana Ross performed the Oscar-winning song "Over the Rainbow" in a tribute to the 50th anniversary of The Wizard of Oz.

Box office performance of nominees
At the time of the nominations announcement on February 14, the combined gross of the five Best Picture nominees at the US box office was $244 million with an average of $48.9 million. Dead Poets Society was the highest earner among the Best Picture nominees with $95.8 million in the domestic box office receipts. The film was followed by Field of Dreams ($64.4 million), Born on the Fourth of July ($48.6 million), Driving Miss Daisy ($35.6 million) and My Left Foot ($2.1 million).

Of the 50 grossing movies of the year, 43 nominations went to 14 films on the list. Only Parenthood (8th), Dead Poets Society (9th), When Harry Met Sally... (10th), Field of Dreams (17th), Born on the Fourth of July (25th), Driving Miss Daisy (36th) and Sex, Lies, and Videotape (45th) were nominated for Best Picture, acting, directing, or screenwriting. The other top 50 box office hits that earned nomination were Batman (1st), Indiana Jones and the Last Crusade (2nd), Lethal Weapon 2 (3rd), Back to the Future II (6th), The Little Mermaid (12th), The Abyss (22nd), and Black Rain (27th).

Critical reviews
The show received a mixed reception from media publications. Some media outlets were more critical of the show. Film critic Janet Maslin of The New York Times gave an average review of Crystal but lamented, "The effort to make this year's Academy Awards show an international media miracle led to nothing but headaches." The Washington Post television critic Tom Shales bemoaned, "while Crystal's opening monologue seemed to hit the right notes, he hit fewer and fewer as the evening wore on; his interjected quips between awards were mostly uninspired." He also criticized the dance numbers and numerous "Around the World" cutaways calling it pointless. Howard Rosenberg of the Los Angeles Times quipped that the broadcast was "a conventional telecast that was arguably an extension of an industry calcified by convention." He gave positive remarks toward Crystal but felt that "The Oscarcast was an old kid on the block."

Other media outlets received the broadcast more positively. USA Today television critic Matt Roush lauded "To the glib and savvy Billy Crystal, who kept things as lively and funny as he could all night long. What a chore, too." He concluded that, "Hollywood no doubt went to bed happy (maybe early), because for a change Oscar didn't embarrass himself." Mike Drew of the Milwaukee Journal Sentinel remarked, "While too "inside" and not as funny as Hollywood thinks he is, Crystal was an efficient host." Film critic Carrie Rickey of The Philadelphia Inquirer wrote, "It was encouraging that director Gilbert Cates took the opportunity to emphasize films instead of chorus girls." She also extolled Crystal's performance acknowledging that his "nimble opening number set a Johnny Carson comic tone."

Ratings and reception
The American telecast on ABC drew in an average of 40.24 million people over its length, which was a 5% decrease from the previous year's ceremony. An estimated 69.31 million total viewers watched all or part of the awards. The show also drew lower Nielsen ratings compared to the previous ceremony with 27.82% of households watching over a 49.42 share.

In July 1990, the ceremony presentation received five nominations at the 42nd Primetime Emmys. Two months later, the ceremony won one of those nominations for Outstanding Art Direction for a Variety or Music or Programming (Roy Christopher and Greg Richman).

See also

 10th Golden Raspberry Awards
 32nd Grammy Awards
 42nd Primetime Emmy Awards
 47th Golden Globe Awards
 43rd British Academy Film Awards
 44th Tony Awards
 List of submissions to the 62nd Academy Awards for Best Foreign Language Film

References

Bibliography

External links

Official websites
 Academy Awards Official website
 The Academy of Motion Picture Arts and Sciences Official website
 Oscar's Channel at YouTube (run by the Academy of Motion Picture Arts and Sciences)

Analysis
 1989 Academy Awards Winners and History Filmsite
 Academy Awards, USA: 1990 Internet Movie Database

Other resources
 

1989 film awards
1990 in American cinema
1990 in Los Angeles
Academy Awards ceremonies
March 1990 events in the United States
Academy
Television shows directed by Jeff Margolis